Crooked Creek is a stream in the U.S. state of West Virginia. It is a tributary of the Guyandotte River.

Crooked Creek was so named on account of its irregular course.

See also
List of rivers of West Virginia

References

Rivers of Logan County, West Virginia
Rivers of West Virginia